Fukuichi Maru No. 5 was an auxiliary patrol boat of the Imperial Japanese Navy during World War II.

History
Fukuichi Maru No. 5 was ordered by Japanese shipping company Tokai Yenyo Gyogyo K.K. and laid down on 1 March 1933 at the shipyard of Goshi Kaisha Kanasashi Zosensho. She was launched and completed on 1 June 1933. On 5 September 1941, she was requisitioned by the Imperial Japanese Navy and converted to an auxiliary patrol boat. She was struck from the Navy list on 10 April 1945.

References

1933 ships
Ships built in Japan
Maritime incidents in February 1945